Hoseynabad-e Gazband (also Romanized as Ḩoseynābād-e Gazband; also known as Ḩoseynābād) is a village in Abravan Rural District, Razaviyeh District, Mashhad County, Razavi Khorasan Province, Iran. At the 2006 census, its population was 152, in 37 families.

References 

Populated places in Mashhad County